Wernsdorf is a small village located in Bavaria, Germany. It is in Oberfranken (Upper Franconia), in the Bamberg district. Wernsdorf is a constituent community of Strullendorf and is located on the state roads 2188 and 2210,  adjoining the neighbouring village of Amlingstadt. The population  was recorded as 444 in 2009.
There is a castle in the town, named the Schloss Wernsdorf.

References

External links
 History of Wernsdorf (on the Strullendorf site), Accessed September 20, 2010 

Villages in Bavaria
Bamberg (district)
Strullendorf